Placynthiella is a genus of lichenized fungi in the family Trapeliaceae. The genus was circumscribed by Russian lichenologist Alexander Elenkin in 1909, with Placynthiella arenicola designated as the type species.

Species
Placynthiella arenicola 
Placynthiella borsodensis 
Placynthiella dasaea 
Placynthiella hurii 
Placynthiella hyporhoda 
Placynthiella icmalea 
Placynthiella knudsenii  – North America
Placynthiella oligotropha 
Placynthiella uliginosa

References

Baeomycetales
Lichen genera
Baeomycetales genera
Taxa described in 1909